Rosita C. Youngblood (born December 20, 1946) is a former Democratic member of the Pennsylvania House of Representatives, representing the 198th District from 1994 until 2020. She was the first black woman to hold a position in Pennsylvania House leadership. She was elected to the House in a special election on April 5, 1994 to fill a vacancy. She held her seat until retirement in 2020.

Ward leader
Youngblood is the Ward Leader of the 13th Ward Democratic Executive Committee.

Negro Mountain
In July 2007, Youngblood called for the renaming of Negro Mountain. In a news release, she said, "Through a school project, my son and granddaughter first informed me of the name of this range and I found it to be disparaging that we have one of our great works of nature named as such… I find it disheartening for tourists who visit this range to see the plaque with the name Negro Mountain displayed on the mountainside."

On 1 August 2007, Youngblood and other lawmakers introduced House Resolution No. 378  resolving that the governor "form a commission …to study the naming of Negro Mountain and Mount Davis …[to] adopt names that accurately reflect the history of the region and the heroism displayed by the African American in the Negro Mountain conflict of 1756" and accordingly to alter "brochures, plaques and signs [to] accurately reflect the facts of this heroic historical event". (The 1921 naming of Mount Davis is now also considered controversial because it honors the white settler who once owned the land, rather than the colonial African-American.)

References

External links
Pennsylvania House of Representatives - Rosita Youngblood. Official PA House website.
Project Vote Smart - Representative Rosita C. Youngblood (PA) profile
Follow the Money - Rosita Youngblood
2006 2004 2002 2000 1998 campaign contributions
Pennsylvania House Democratic Caucus - Rep. Rosita Youngblood. Official Party website.

Members of the Pennsylvania House of Representatives
1946 births
Living people
Women state legislators in Pennsylvania
African-American state legislators in Pennsylvania
African-American women in politics
Antioch University alumni
21st-century American politicians
21st-century American women politicians
21st-century African-American women
21st-century African-American politicians
20th-century African-American people
20th-century African-American women